The Ramparts are a mountain range in the Canadian Rockies.  Part of the Park Ranges, they straddle the Continental Divide and lie partly within Jasper National Park in Alberta and Mount Robson Provincial Park in British Columbia.

There are 10 named summits in the group, the highest of which is Mount Geikie.  Most were named by the Alpine Club of Canada and carry military engineering themed names such as Bastion, Parapet, Redoubt, Postern, and Dungeon. They form a western boundary for the Tonquin Valley.  Amethyst Lake lies to the east, while the headwaters of the Fraser River bound it to the west.

References

Mountain ranges of British Columbia
Mountain ranges of Alberta
Ranges of the Canadian Rockies
Mount Robson Provincial Park